Pat Reynolds is an Irish former Gaelic footballer who played for the Meath county team. He had much success playing inter-county football in the 1960s on the Meath team. He usually played as a halfback. He also played club football for Walterstown. During his playing career he won one Senior All Ireland medal (1967). When Reynolds played for Meath, they had a very strong team, but Galway beat them in 1964 and 1966. Reynolds continued playing for Meath into the seventies. He played in the first eighty-minute All Ireland final against Kerry in 1970.

He was picked for the left halfback position in 1971, in the first year of the All Star Awards thus it is Meath's first All star.  Indeed, Pat was Meath's only All Star that season.

Pat was a selector on the Meath team when Seán Boylan in the 1980s and early 1990s, and this time Meath won two All Ireland titles.

His son Paddy won two All Ireland medals with Meath and one All Star.

Pat is a potato farmer in Garlow Cross in Co Meath supplying among others the Tayto brand. His son Paddy also works on in the business.

External links
 Official Meath Website

References

Year of birth missing
Possibly living people
Gaelic football backs
Gaelic football selectors
Meath inter-county Gaelic footballers
Walterstown Gaelic footballers